Charles Darrell (29 June 1859 – 25 March 1932) was an English playwright who specialized in melodrama.

Early life

Darrell was born in London, England.

Selected works 
His plays include:
When London Sleeps: Charles Holloway's production at Theatre Royal, Melbourne in 1898; basis of the 1932 film When London Sleeps
The Power and the Glory (1898); first Australian performance in 1899
Defender of the Faith; first Australian production 1900
Her Luck in London (1905); first Australian production 1906; basis of the 1914 film Her Luck in London
What a Man Made Her (1909)
A Girl's Good Luck (1912)
In A Man's Grip (1913)
The Millionaire and the Woman (1916)
Should a Wife Refuse? (1917)
Tommy's French Wife (1918)
A Girl in the Web (1919)
From Shopgirl to Duchess; first Australian production 1909; basis of the 1917 film From Shopgirl to Duchess
The Girl Who Knew a Bit; Australian rights purchased by William Anderson 1911. 
The Idol of Paris, basis of the 1914 film The Idol of Paris, was also the English title of Sarah Bernhardt's autobiography.
White as a Lily?; first Australian production 1913
When Paris Sleeps (1913), first Australia production 1920; basis of the 1917 film When Paris Sleeps

References 

1859 births
1932 deaths
19th-century English dramatists and playwrights